The Aero A.102 was a Czechoslovakian fighter aircraft that flew in prototype form in 1934. It was developed in response to a Czech Air Force requirement of that year, but was passed over in favour of the Avia B.35.

The A.102 was of gull winged monoplane configuration with tailwheel undercarriage, and was perhaps inspired by the successful PZL P.11.

Specifications (A.102)

See also

References

Notes

Bibliography
Green, William and Gordon Swanborough. The Complete Book of Fighters. New York: Smithmark, 1994. .

Single-engined tractor aircraft
Parasol-wing aircraft
Gull-wing aircraft
1930s Czechoslovakian fighter aircraft
A102
Aircraft first flown in 1934